FC Slavoj Vyšehrad is a football club located in Prague-Nusle, Czech Republic, and named after Vyšehrad. It currently plays in the Bohemian Football League (ČFL), which is the third tier of the Czech football system.

History
The club was founded 1907 and plays its home matches at the 2,500-capacity Stadion Slavoj Vyšehrad.

Notable coaches
 Dušan Uhrin, Jr. (1994–1997)
 Jan Berger senior (2009)

Seasons
 2003/04: Divize B – 6
 2004/05: Divize B – 10
 2005/06: Divize B – 7
 2006/07: Divize A – 1
 2007/08: ČFL – 12
 2008/09: ČFL – 16
 2009/10: ČFL – 17
 2010/11: Divize B – 4
 2011/12: Divize B – 7
 2012/13: Divize B – 2
 2013/14: Divize B – 2
 2014/15: ČFL – 3
 2015/16: FNL – 15
 2016/17: ČFL – 13
 2017/18: ČFL – 14
 2018/19: ČFL – 1
 2019/20: FNL – 12
 2020/21: FNL – 14
 2021/22: ČFL – 16, group A (relegated to Prague Championship)

Players

Current squad
.

Notable players
The following players have played senior international football:
 Lukáš Došek, Czech national football team
 Zdeněk Hruška, Czech national team (FIFA World Cup 1982)
 Marek Kincl, Czech national team
 Petr Kouba, Czech national team (UEFA Euro 1996)
 Luděk Macela, Czech national team (1980 Summer Olympics)

References

External links
 Official website 
 FK Slavoj Vyšehrad at the website of the Prague Football Association 
 Young teams Facebook page, info, team members, photos, calendar 

 
Football clubs in the Czech Republic
Association football clubs established in 1907
1907 establishments in Austria-Hungary